Patricia Wilson Berger (May 1, 1926 – March 27, 2011) was a special and administrative librarian who worked in several professional organizations throughout her career. Later on, she became the president of the American Library Association and a member of the Chi Omega and Cosmos Club.

Life and education 
Patricia Wilson Berger was born May 1, 1926, to Thomas Decatur Wood and Nina Hughes. She earned her Bachelor of Science Degree from George Washington University in 1965 and then her MLS degree at the Catholic University of America in 1974. She married George H.C. Berger on May 20, 1970.

Career 
During her career, Berger worked as a special and administrative librarian in several different organizations. These organizations include the National Bureau of Standards, the Institute of Defense Analysis, the United States Patent and Trademark Office, and the Environmental Protection Agency. From there, she became the president of The American Library Association (ALA) in 1989 and held the position until 1990.

While Berger was president of the ALA, she created a committee to help oversee the policies related to preservation. This committee is called The President's Committee on Preservation Policy. Patricia was also involved in the District of Columbia Library Association, Federal Librarians Round table, ALA's executive board, Virginia State Library Board, ALA Council, Freedom to Read Foundation and the Special Libraries Association.

Awards 
In 2001, Berger was awarded the District of Columbia Library Association President's Award as well as The Catholic University of America's Distinguished Alumna Award.

References 

 

1926 births
2011 deaths
American librarians
American women librarians
Presidents of the American Library Association
George Washington University alumni
Catholic University of America alumni